The Bear Lake County Courthouse, located in Paris, is the county courthouse serving Bear Lake County, Idaho. Built in 1884–85, the building is one of Idaho's oldest county courthouses. Architect Truman O. Angell designed the building in the Italian Renaissance Revival style. The front entrance to the building has a two-story portico supported by Doric columns and topped by a pediment. A square cupola with bracketed pediments on each side tops the building's hipped roof.

The courthouse was listed on the National Register of Historic Places in 1977.

This courthouse was replaced by a new one in summer 2020. Despite efforts by state and local historical societies to preserve the courthouse, the county commission decided to spend $200,000+ to have it demolished on February 22, 2021.

References

Buildings and structures in Bear Lake County, Idaho
Courthouses on the National Register of Historic Places in Idaho
Government buildings completed in 1885
County courthouses in Idaho
National Register of Historic Places in Bear Lake County, Idaho